The Ternin is a river in Burgundy, France, a right tributary of the Arroux, which is a tributary of the Loire. The length is 48 km, and its drainage basin is 257 km2. The source of the Ternin is near Saulieu, in the Morvan hills. It flows south through the villages Alligny-en-Morvan, Lucenay-l'Évêque and Tavernay, and joins the Arroux in Autun.

References

Rivers of France
Rivers of Bourgogne-Franche-Comté
Rivers of Côte-d'Or
Rivers of Saône-et-Loire